Daniel James Giffard  (born 10 November 1984) in Eastbourne, East Sussex, is a speedway rider in the United Kingdom, who rode with the Redcar Bears in the Premier League. 

He has represented Great Britain at Under-21 level.

References 

1984 births
Living people
British speedway riders
Sportspeople from Eastbourne
English motorcycle racers
Isle of Wight Islanders riders
Redcar Bears riders
Rye House Rockets riders
Stoke Potters riders